Nakago or Nakagō may refer to:

Nakagō, Niigata, a former village in Nakakubiki District, Niigata Prefecture, Japan
Nakago (Fushigi Yūgi), a character in the manga series Fushigi Yūgi
, Japanese baseball player
, a tang of a Japanese sword

Japanese-language surnames